Camille Raspail was a French doctor and politician in the National Assembly as a deputy from Var, from 1885 until his death in 1893.
Son of François-Vincent Raspail, he practiced medicine for 44 years.
He is buried in the Montparnasse Cemetery, with a three-quarter bronze bust on his tomb. On the tomb are engravings explaining he was commander in chief of the southern forts during the Siege of Paris in 1870-1871, as well as a doctor and deputy for Var. His tomb also has a bronze medallion showing a left-facing profile, along with a profile of his widow and an oak leaf crown.

References 

Physicians from Paris
1827 births
1893 deaths
19th-century French physicians
Members of the 4th Chamber of Deputies of the French Third Republic
Members of the 5th Chamber of Deputies of the French Third Republic
People from Var (department)
French military personnel of the Franco-Prussian War